Yidi may refer to:

 Yidi (god) (a brewer credited with the invention of [alcohol during the reign of Yu the Great
 Wang Yidi (born 1997), Chinese table tennis player
 Yidi, another name for the traditional 4 groups of barbarians in ancient China
 Yidi, the short posthumous name of the Zhengde Emperor of the Ming Dynasty
 Yidi, the short posthumous name of the Tongzhi Emperor of the Qing Dynasty